Burttia may refer to:
 Burttia (insect), a genus of grasshoppers in the family Acrididae
 Burttia (plant), a genus of flowering plants in the family Connaraceae